U-Go Mobility is a future bus company in Sydney, Australia, that will commence operating in July 2023. It is a 50:50 joint venture between UGL and Go-Ahead Group.

History
In December 2022, U-Go Mobility was awarded a seven-year contract to operate bus services region 10 in the Canterbury-Bankstown, Georges River and Sutherland Shire regions. The enlarged region 10 will incorporate the services of region 5 operated by Punchbowl Bus Company and region 10 services operated by Transdev NSW.

Fleet
U-Go Mobility will commence operations with a fleet of 225 buses.

References

Australian companies established in 2023
Bus companies of New South Wales
Bus transport in Sydney
Go-Ahead Group companies
Transport companies established in 2023
Joint ventures